"Lay Down Your Arms" is a 1956 popular music song with music by Åke Gerhard and Leon Landgren and lyrics by Gerhard (original "Anne-Caroline" Swedish) and Paddy Roberts (English).

Recorded Versions
In the United States, the biggest hit version was recorded by The Chordettes, reaching No. 16 on the Billboard chart. 
In the United Kingdom, Forces sweetheart Anne Shelton had the major hit, reaching No. 1 on the UK Singles Chart, and stayed in the Top Twenty for 14 weeks. Initially the BBC took a dim view of the song as it might have encouraged British troops to 'lay down their guns', at a difficult time of the post-Suez crisis and the conflict in Cyprus with EOKA. The ban was soon lifted when many requested it on "Two-Way Family Favourites", a popular Sunday lunchtime radio show. Another UK version was recorded by Billie Anthony.

Song in Media
The song was also used in a British television play written by Dennis Potter called Lay Down Your Arms, which was screened on 23 May 1970. The play is set during the Suez crisis of 1956.

See also
List of UK Singles Chart number ones of the 1950s

References

1956 songs
1956 singles
The Chordettes songs
Song recordings produced by Johnny Franz
Songs written by Åke Gerhard